The 1921 AAA Championship Car season consisted of 20 races, beginning in Beverly Hills, California on February 27 and concluding in San Carlos, California on December 11.  There was also one non-championship race.  The AAA National Champion and Indianapolis 500 winner was Tommy Milton.

Schedule and results
All races running on Dirt/Brick/Board Oval.

Leading National Championship standings

References

See also
 1921 Indianapolis 500

AAA Championship Car season
AAA Championship Car
1921 in American motorsport